Cristian Ramirez may refer to:

 Cristian Ramírez (Argentine footballer), Argentine footballer
 Cristian Ramírez (Ecuadorian footballer), Ecuadorian footballer
 Cristian Ramírez (Paraguayan footballer), Paraguayan footballer
 Cristián Moll Ramírez, Chilean handball player

See also 
 Christian Ramirez (disambiguation)